The Filipino indie folk/folk pop/pop rock band Ben&Ben has released two studio albums, one extended play (EP), 31 singles, five promotional singles, and one charity single under the record labels Sony Music Philippines and Sindikato. In addition, the band has released 29 music videos, is featured in three singles and four music videos by other artists, and their songs have been used in 12 films and television series.

The band was formed as The Benjamins in 2015 by Paolo and Miguel Benjamin Guico. It debuted with the single "Tinatangi", for which they also made a music video. In 2016, the band was renamed and released an eponymous EP consisting of seven songs. In 2017, Ben&Ben expanded into an ensemble, adding Poch Barretto as electric guitarist, Jam Villanueva as drummer, Agnes Reoma as bassist, Patricia Lasaten as keyboardist, Toni Muñoz and Andrew de Pano as percussionists, as well as Keifer Cabugao as violinist, with the Guicos being acoustic guitarists. The band achieved recognition in 2018 for incorporating songs into several Filipino films (such as Goyo: The Boy General) and television series (such as Coke Studio Homecoming). It released its debut studio album, Limasawa Street, in 2019; and released its second, Pebble House, Vol. 1: Kuwaderno, in 2021. The band has collaborated with various artists and has recorded a charity single as part of the COVID-19 pandemic relief effort.

In April 2020, Ben&Ben jumped from 48th to 29th place in the Billboard Social 50 chart, which ranks artists by Internet engagements. In July, it ranked 1st in the South Korean music service Melon's real-time search following positive reviews of their song "Leaves" by various K-pop artists, notably by Young K of Day6, who made a 2020 cover version with Ben&Ben due to popular demand. The next month, Ben&Ben made cover versions of K-pop songs on their YouTube channel, in response to fan requests. Three days after its release, seven songs from Kuwaderno reached Spotify's Top 100 chart; the rest, as well as some of their previous songs, reached the Top 200 chart. In 2020 and 2021, the band was Spotify's most-streamed Original Pilipino music (OPM) Artist and Group. In 2021, Ben&Ben set a new record in the folk pop genre, with "nearly 300 million streams in [over] 170 countries". The band has received various accolades locally and internationally, including the Awit Awards and NME Awards.

Studio albums

Extended plays

Singles

As lead artist

As featured artist

Promotional singles

Charity singles

Music videos

Usages as soundtracks

See also 

 List of Philippine-based music groups
 Pinoy pop
 Pinoy rock

Notes

References

External links
 Ben&Ben official website
 Ben&Ben at AllMusic
 

Discographies of Filipino artists
Pop music group discographies
Discography